Darsanakalanidhi Parikshith Thampuran (died 1964) was the last official ruler of the Cochin princely state. He was also known as Ramavarman or Kunjunni Tampuran. He was born in 1876 as the son of Raman Nambutiri of Ottur House and Manku Tampuratti. On 1 July 1949, Travancore and Cochin merged, Travancore-Cochin State came into existence, and the kingdom and the rulership came to an end. He ruled the kingdom for a period of one year and then he continued as the Valliya Thampuran of Cochin. He died in 1964 while he was in Thrippunithura. He was married to Ittyanath Madathil Madhavi from Ittyanath family Villadom, Thrissur. Madhavi was the step daughter of his uncle Rama Varma XVII and Parukutty Nethyaramma (Ittyanath Madathil Parukutty).

Coronation 
Parikshith Thampuran had his coronation on the grounds of the Durbar Hall in Ernakulam in August, 1948. This was away from the convention that the coronation was to be held at the Ariyittuvazhcha Kovilakam in Mattancherry.

Work
Thampuran was a Sanskrit scholar of supreme rank. He also wrote many Sanskrit Kāvya, like Prahlādacharita.He was an authority on Nyaya and wrote commentaries on several literary works, besides composing original Sanskrit works of his own.

References

Rulers of Cochin
1964 deaths
Year of birth missing